Agonopterix burmana is a moth in the family Depressariidae. It was described by Alexandr L. Lvovsky in 1998. It is found in north-eastern Myanmar and Shaanxi, China.

References

Moths described in 1998
Agonopterix
Moths of Asia